Smyrna High School may refer to:

 Smyrna High School (Delaware)
 Smyrna High School (Tennessee)